Song Pingshun (July 1945 – June 3, 2007) was a People's Republic of China politician. He was born in Tianjin, with his ancestral home in Shenze County, Hebei Province (part of the provincial capital Shijiazhuang). In September 1970 he joined the Communist Party of China. In 1983, Song became deputy chief of the Tianjin Police Department and later chief and party committee secretary. In 1993, he was made deputy mayor of Tianjin and Chairmen of Tianjin CPPCC Tianjin Committee in January 2003. 

Song committed suicide in 2007 after his expulsion from the Communist Party.

1945 births
2007 deaths
Chinese politicians who committed suicide
Expelled members of the Chinese Communist Party
Chinese police officers
People's Republic of China politicians from Tianjin
Chinese Communist Party politicians from Tianjin